¡All-Time Quarterback! was the first release of Ben Gibbard's solo project ¡All-Time Quarterback!. A limited number of the CD EP was released on Elsinor Records. All of the tracks from this release were collected and re-released by Barsuk on 2002's ¡All-Time Quarterback! along with a number of tracks from The Envelope Sessions. The original CD EP release came with two inserts: one blue insert containing the lyrics and one orange insert with the credits.

Track listing
 "Plans Get Complex"
 "Untitled" 
 "Why I Cry" 
 "Rules Broken" 
 "Send Packing"

Credits
Written, recorded, and performed by Ben Gibbard at The Hall Of Justice, winter '99
Nick helped by playing percussion on "Untitled"
Drums on "Why I Cry" were looped from a Rat Cat Hogan song, and thus were played by Rob
"Why I Cry" is a Magnetic Fields song, copyright 1995 and written by Stephin Merritt
Thank you to Allisyn, Joe and Jay Hydra, DCFC, Rat Cat Hogan, and The Gladstone House
Letterpressing by Allisyn

1999 debut EPs
¡All-Time Quarterback! EPs